The abduction of Chloe Ayling occurred in July 2017 while Ayling, a British page 3 model, had travelled to Milan, Italy for a fake photo-shoot. There, she was abducted by two individuals claiming to be members of a criminal organisation called The Black Death Group. In June 2018, Lukasz Herba, a Polish national from the United Kingdom, was convicted in a Milan court of the kidnapping and sentenced to 16 years and nine months in prison.

In 2021, the 16-year sentence of Michal Herba was reduced on appeal to 5 years and 8 months. The sentence of Lukasz Herba had already been reduced, in 2020, to 12 years and 1 month.

Abduction 
Ayling, from Coulsdon and aged 20 at the time of the incident, was working in London for Phil Green's Supermodel Agency. In March 2017, Green, a lawyer and part-time DJ, had previously brokered a failed photo-shoot in Paris for Ayling which was later revealed to have been a scheme organised by Lukasz Herba, a 30-year-old Polish computer programmer from Oldbury, West Midlands, under the alias "Andre Lazio". In July 2017, while Ayling was on a photo-shoot in Dubai, Green was contacted again by Lazio, requesting another attempt at the photo-shoot in Milan on 12 July.

When Ayling did not return to the UK via Gatwick that night, her mother contacted Green. The next morning, Green received a ransom email, ostensibly from The Black Death Group and written by "MD" (another Herba alias) demanding €300,000 or else Ayling would be auctioned off as a sex-slave on the dark web on 16 July. Green then contacted the UK consulate in Milan for support. Italian police then visited the address, which turned out to not be a photo studio at all. Inside, they found some of Ayling's clothes, and, in the absence of other evidence or emails, the investigation stalled. However, after six days, on Monday 17 July, Ayling and Herba turned up together at the Milan consulate, and suspicion quickly fell on the couple after CCTV footage of them together in public emerged.

Trial 
At his trial, the Italian court heard that Herba had injected Ayling with ketamine (as evidenced by an injection mark and traces of the drug in her hair), handcuffed her, put her in a holdall bag, and driven her in the boot of a car to a house in Viù near Turin. Throughout the kidnapping, Herba had used his MD alias to try to befriend Ayling by manipulating the events of the kidnapping and the fictional auction. Herba claimed in his defence that he had fallen in love with Ayling and was trying to promote her career by creating a scandal. On 11 June 2018, Herba was convicted of kidnapping and sentenced to 16 years and nine months in prison; Herba said in the closing statement of his trial that he was inspired after watching the movie By Any Means.

Shortly into the investigation, Herba's brother, Michał Herba (37), who runs a transport logistics company called Her Trans Logistics Limited, was also arrested. Michał Herba, who denies any involvement, is alleged to have participated in the kidnapping given the presence of an accomplice. Based on email and DNA evidence (his hair was found in the car's boot), he was extradited from the UK in October 2018, and is currently standing trial in the case.

Aftermath 
The case brought attention to "The Black Death Group", an organisation alleged to exist in Eastern Europe and operating on the dark web over frequently-changing URLs. The group was investigated by Interpol in 2015. The group is known to have posted images of captives for sale; however, those postings are largely considered to be fake, since further investigation determined that they were taken from a pornographic film.

Ayling and Green both wrote memoirs of the events. The British media, in particular, were quick to suspect the kidnapping was a publicity stunt.  Ayling has also been criticised in the media for leveraging the event for the benefit of her career.

References

External links

Kidnappings in Italy
Underground culture
Dark web
Human commodity auctions
July 2017 events in Italy
July 2017 crimes in Europe